Cult is the title of the third full-length LP by the band Apocalyptica released in 2000 with a special-edition released in 2001 containing an extra disc, mixed and mastered at Finnvox. Apocalyptica's first two albums consisted mostly of cover versions; Cult was their first album to feature mainly original composition, along with using distortion effects much more boldly and frequently, which gave the album a more orchestral sound, and also the album experimented with vocals and other instrumentation. There are some versions of the first release with "Path Vol. 2" as the first track and "Path" as the fourteenth. This is the last Apocalyptica album to feature Max Lilja on cello. The song "Hope Vol.2" has a music video which features scenes from the film Vidocq. Cult, along with Inquisition Symphony and Live, were all released together in the Limited Edition Collectors Box Set.

Track listing

Note
 Also Live at Muffatwerk, München on October 24, 2000 and are also from Inquisition Symphony

Reception

Credits

Apocalyptica
Eicca Toppinen – cello; music, double bass, percussion, liner notes, arrangements
Max Lilja – cello
Paavo Lötjönen – cello
Perttu Kivilaakso – cello

Additional personnel

Path Vol.2
Sandra Nasić – vocals; lyrics 
Clemens Matzenik – engineering at Horus

Hope Vol.2
Matthias Sayer – vocals; lyrics
Jeff Collier – lyrics

Other
Kai "Hiili" Hiilesmaa – percussion
Mika Jussila – mastering
Niina Pasanen – styling
Jyrki Tuovinen – engineering (10) and recording

Mixing
Mikko Karmila – Disc 1
T-T Oksala – Disc 2

Imagining
Cover art
Eero Heikkinen
Juri

Photographers
Vertti Teräsvuori
Olaf Heine

Writers
Writers on Disc 1 (13) & (14) / Disc 2 (4)
James Hetfield 
Lars Ulrich
Cliff Burton – only on "Fight Fire with Fire"

Writer on Hall of the Mountain King
Edvard Grieg

Writers on Inquisition Symphony
Sepultura
Max Cavalera
Andreas Kisser 
Paulo Jr. 
Igor Cavalera

References

Apocalyptica albums
2000 albums
Classical albums
Mercury Records albums
Universal Music Group albums